The 2018 California Golden Bears football team represented the University of California, Berkeley in the 2018 NCAA Division I FBS football season. The Bears went 7–6 during Justin Wilcox's second year as head coach. The Bears upset #15 Washington 12–10 and defeated USC 15–14 at the Los Angeles Memorial Coliseum in Los Angeles to snap a 15-year losing streak to the Trojans, but at the same time, they also snapped a 18-year losing streak to USC in the Coliseum. They lost 10–7 in overtime to TCU in the 2018 Cheez-It Bowl.

Bears offensive efficiency ranked as the second worst among all Power Five teams. This ranking was in direct contrast to Cal's offensive performances under Cal's previous coach Sonny Dykes, in 2014 Cal was ranked No. 11 in nation in points scored, and in 2015 was ranked No. 13 in total yards. However, there was an inverse contrast in team's defensive performance as Wilcox's 2018 team was ranked No. 15 in total yards allowed as opposed to consistent bottom of the charts performances under Dykes. Two standouts of Cal's defense were second team All-Pac-12 linebacker junior Evan Weaver who had 155 tackles and two interceptions, and first team All-Pac-12 senior Jordan Kunaszyk who had 143 tackles, six forced fumbles and one fumble recovered; Kunaszyk went undrafted but was later signed by the Carolina Panthers.

Previous season

First-year head coach Justin Wilcox was hired in January 2017, following the dismissal of Sonny Dykes. Wilcox led the Golden Bears to a record of 5–7 (2–7 Pac-12) in 2017 to finish in fifth place in the North Division.  In a season highlight, the Bears beat No. 8-ranked Washington State by a margin of 37–3.

On December 5, 2017, defensive line coach Jerry Azzinaro left the Golden Bears after one season to become the new defensive coordinator for the UCLA Bruins under Chip Kelly.

NFL Draft Selections

The Golden Bears had two individuals selected in the 2018 NFL Draft.

Recruiting

Position key

Recruits

The Golden Bears signed a total of 21 recruits.

Preseason

Award watch lists
Listed in the order that they were released

Pac-12 Media Days
The 2018 Pac-12 media days are set for July 25, 2018 in Hollywood, California. Justin Wilcox (HC), Patrick Laird (RB) & Jordan Kunaszyk (LB) at Pac-12 Media Days. The Pac-12 media poll was released with the Golden Bears predicted to finish in fourth place at Pac-12 North division.

Schedule 

Sources:

Personnel

Coaching staff

Roster

Game summaries

North Carolina

at BYU

Idaho State

Oregon

at Arizona

UCLA

at Oregon State

Washington

at Washington State

at USC

Colorado

Stanford

vs. TCU (Cheez-It Bowl)

Media Affiliates

Radio
KGO 810 AM - Joe Starkey, Mike Pawlawski, Todd McKim
with Hal Ramey and Lee Grosscup
KALX 90.7 FM

TV
Pac-12 Network
FSN/ESPN

Rankings

Awards and honors

Award finalists
 Patrick Laird (RB)
 Burlsworth Trophy Finalist
 Senior CLASS Award Finalist

Award semifinalists
 Tim DeRuyter (DC/OLB Coach)
 Broyles Award Semifinalist
 Jordan Kunaszyk (LB)
 Lott IMPACT Trophy Semifinalist
 Patrick Laird (RB)
 Campbell Trophy Semifinalist

Award watchlists
 Evan Weaver (LB)
 Lott IMPACT Trophy Watch List

Weekly awards
 Team awards
 FWAA National Team of the Week (Week 11 vs USC)
 Steven Coutts (P)
 Pac-12 Special Teams Player of the Week (Week 13 vs Colorado)
 Luc Bequette (DE)
 Pac-12 Defensive Player of the Week (Week 11 vs USC)
 Ashtyn Davis (S)
 Pac-12 Defensive Player of the Week (Week 13 vs Colorado)
 Evan Weaver (LB)
 Pac-12 Defensive Player of the Week (Week 9 vs Washington)
 CSM Pac-12 Defensive Player of the Week (Week 9 vs Washington)

Honors
 Patrick Laird (RB)
 Allstate AFCA Good Works Team
 Google Cloud Academic All-District Team

All-Pac-12

References

California
California Golden Bears football seasons
California Golden Bears football